Middlefork Township is an inactive township in Worth County, in the U.S. state of Missouri.

Middlefork Township takes its name from the Middle Fork Grand River.

References

Townships in Missouri
Townships in Worth County, Missouri